Zetel is a municipality in the district of Friesland, Lower Saxony, Germany. It is situated approximately 15 km southwest of Wilhelmshaven, and 12 km west of Varel. Zetel is twinned with the county of Sutherland in the Highlands of Scotland.

Notable residents
 Johannes Bitter, professional Handball player
 grim104, German rapper, half of Berlin duo Zugezogen Maskulin
 Karin Evers-Meyer, politician (SPD)
 Wilhelm Kunst, wood sculptor

References

Friesland (district)